Andriy Busko (born 20 May 1997) is a Ukrainian professional footballer who plays as defender for FC Lviv in the Ukrainian Premier League.

Career
Born in Cherneve, Mostyska Raion, Busko is a product of the FC Karpaty Lviv academy system. He made his debut for FC Karpaty as a substitute against FC Dynamo Kyiv on 29 July 2017 in the Ukrainian Premier League.

References

External links
Statistics at FFU website (Ukr)

1997 births
Living people
Ukrainian footballers
Ukraine student international footballers
FC Karpaty Lviv players
Ukrainian Premier League players
Ukrainian First League players
FC Rukh Lviv players
FC Lviv players
Association football midfielders
Sportspeople from Lviv Oblast